Salto Arriba is a barrio in the municipality of Utuado, Puerto Rico. Its population in 2010 was 617.

Geography

History
Puerto Rico was ceded by Spain in the aftermath of the Spanish–American War under the terms of the Treaty of Paris of 1898 and became an unincorporated territory of the United States. In 1899, the United States Department of War conducted a census of Puerto Rico finding that the population of Salto Arriba barrio was 855.

There is a bridge over the Río Grande on PR-123 in Salto Arriba that is prone to collapse with heavy rains. A temporary bridge washed away with flooding from Hurricane Fiona on September 18, 2022. It was a temporary structure which had been built after Hurricane Maria on September 20, 2017 washed away the original bridge.

See also

 List of communities in Puerto Rico

References

Barrios of Utuado, Puerto Rico